The 1950–51 Greek Football Cup was the ninth edition of the Greek Football Cup. The competition culminated with the Greek Cup Final, held at Leoforos Alexandras Stadium, on 11 March 1951. The match was contested by Olympiacos and PAOK, with Olympiacos winning by 4–0.

Calendar

Qualification round

First round

|-
|colspan="5" style="background-color:#D0D0D0" align=center|Central Greece/Islands Football Clubs Association
||colspan="2" rowspan="8" 

||colspan="2" rowspan="15" 

|-
|colspan="5" style="background-color:#D0D0D0" align=center|Patras/Western Greece Football Clubs Association
||colspan="2" rowspan="6" 

||colspan="2" 
|-
|colspan="5" style="background-color:#D0D0D0" align=center|Crete Football Clubs Association
||colspan="2" rowspan="7" 

|-
|colspan="5" style="background-color:#D0D0D0" align=center|Thessaly Football Clubs Association
||colspan="2" rowspan="4" 

||colspan="2" 
|-
|colspan="5" style="background-color:#D0D0D0" align=center|Macedonia Football Clubs Association
||colspan="2" rowspan="4" 

||colspan="2" rowspan="6" 

|-
|colspan="5" style="background-color:#D0D0D0" align=center|Eastern Macedonia Football Clubs Association
||colspan="2" rowspan="8" 

|}

1 Suspended due to incidends in favour of Olympiacos Corinth. That remained as the final score.

2 Suspended at the extra time due to incidends at the expense of Panegieus.

3 Averof Ioannina initially won 2–1, but Atromitos Ioannina objected and the match was replayed.

4 The match was suspended at the second half due to rainfall and was replayed.

5 Olympos Katerini won 5–2 but was zeroed.

Second round

|-
|colspan="6" style="background-color:#D0D0D0" align=center|Central Greece/Islands Football Clubs Association
||colspan="3" rowspan="4" 

|-
|colspan="6" style="background-color:#D0D0D0" align=center|Patras/Western Greece Football Clubs Association
||colspan="3" rowspan="11" 

|-
|colspan="6" style="background-color:#D0D0D0" align=center|Crete Football Clubs Association
|| 
||colspan="3" rowspan="2" 

|-
|colspan="6" style="background-color:#D0D0D0" align=center|Thessaly Football Clubs Association
||colspan="3" rowspan="3" 

|-
|colspan="6" style="background-color:#D0D0D0" align=center|Macedonia Football Clubs Association
||colspan="3" 
|-
|colspan="6" style="background-color:#D0D0D0" align=center|Eastern Macedonia Football Clubs Association
||colspan="3" 

||colspan="3" 
|}

* Suspended due to darkness.

** Suspended at the extra time due to incidends at the expense of Aris Drama.

Third round

|-
|colspan="5" style="background-color:#D0D0D0" align=center|Central Greece/Islands Football Clubs Association
||colspan="2" rowspan="3" 

||colspan="2" rowspan="8" 

|-
|colspan="5" style="background-color:#D0D0D0" align=center|Patras/Western Greece Football Clubs Association
||colspan="2" rowspan="6" 

|-
|colspan="5" style="background-color:#D0D0D0" align=center|Crete Football Clubs Association
||colspan="2" rowspan="2" 

|-
|colspan="5" style="background-color:#D0D0D0" align=center|Thessaly Football Clubs Association
||colspan="2" 
|-
|colspan="5" style="background-color:#D0D0D0" align=center|Macedonia Football Clubs Association

||colspan="2" rowspan="4" 

|-
|colspan="5" style="background-color:#D0D0D0" align=center|Eastern Macedonia Football Clubs Association
||colspan="2" 
|}

Fourth round

|-
|colspan="5" style="background-color:#D0D0D0" align=center|Central Greece/Islands Football Clubs Association
||colspan="2" rowspan="6" 

|-
|colspan="5" style="background-color:#D0D0D0" align=center|Patras/Western Greece Football Clubs Association
||colspan="2" rowspan="3" 

|-
|colspan="5" style="background-color:#D0D0D0" align=center|Crete Football Clubs Association

|-
|colspan="5" style="background-color:#D0D0D0" align=center|Thessaly Football Clubs Association
||colspan="2" 
|-
|colspan="5" style="background-color:#D0D0D0" align=center|Macedonia Football Clubs Association
||colspan="2" 
|}

*The match was replayed after the first match was suspended due to rainfall at the extra time while the score was 1–1.

Fifth round

|-
|colspan="5" style="background-color:#D0D0D0" align=center|Central Greece/Islands Football Clubs Association
||colspan="2" rowspan="3" 

|-
|colspan="5" style="background-color:#D0D0D0" align=center|Patras/Western Greece Football Clubs Association
||colspan="2" 
|-
|colspan="5" style="background-color:#D0D0D0" align=center|Macedonia Football Clubs Association
||colspan="2" rowspan="2" 

|-
|colspan="5" style="background-color:#D0D0D0" align=center|Eastern Macedonia Football Clubs Association
||colspan="2" 

|}

Sixth round

|-
|colspan="5" style="background-color:#D0D0D0" align=center|Central Greece/Islands Football Clubs Association

|-
|colspan="5" style="background-color:#D0D0D0" align=center|Patras/Western Greece Football Clubs Association

|-
|colspan="5" style="background-color:#D0D0D0" align=center|Eastern Macedonia Football Clubs Association

|}

* Aris Kerkyra won 3–4 but Achilleus Patras objected for illegal usage of 2 Aris Kerkyra's football players and was awarded the match.

Knockout phase
In the knockout phase, teams play against each other over a single match. If the match ends up as a draw, extra time will be played and if the match remains a draw a replay match is set at the home of the guest team which the extra time rule stands as well. That procedure will be repeated until a winner occurs. The mechanism of the draws for each round is as follows:
In the draw for the round of 16, the eight top teams of each association are seeded and the eight clubs that passed the qualification round are unseeded.The seeded teams are drawn against the unseeded teams with the exception of 2 draws.
In the draws for the quarter-finals onwards, there are no seedings, and teams from the same group can be drawn against each other.

Bracket

Round of 16

||colspan="2" rowspan="6" 

||colspan="2" 
|}

Quarter-finals

|}

Semi-finals

|}

Final

The 9th Greek Cup Final was played at the Leoforos Alexandras Stadium.

References

External links
Greek Cup 1950-51 at RSSSF

Greek Football Cup seasons
Greek Cup
Cup